The superformula is a generalization of the superellipse and was proposed by Johan Gielis around 2000. Gielis suggested that the formula can be used to describe many complex shapes and curves that are found in nature. Gielis has filed a patent application related to the synthesis of patterns generated by the superformula, which expired effective 2020-05-10.

In polar coordinates, with  the radius and  the angle, the superformula is:

By choosing different values for the parameters  and  different shapes can be generated.

The formula was obtained by generalizing the superellipse, named and popularized by Piet Hein, a Danish mathematician.

2D plots 

In the following examples the values shown above each figure should be m, n1, n2 and n3.

A GNU Octave program for generating these figures

function sf2d(n, a)
  u = [0:.001:2 * pi];
  raux = abs(1 / a(1) .* abs(cos(n(1) * u / 4))) .^ n(3) + abs(1 / a(2) .* abs(sin(n(1) * u / 4))) .^ n(4);
  r = abs(raux) .^ (- 1 / n(2));
  x = r .* cos(u);
  y = r .* sin(u);
  plot(x, y);
end

Extension to higher dimensions 
It is possible to extend the formula to 3, 4, or n dimensions, by means of the spherical product of superformulas. For example, the 3D parametric surface is obtained by multiplying two superformulas r1 and r2. The coordinates are defined by the relations:

where  (latitude) varies between −π/2 and π/2 and θ (longitude) between −π and π.

3D plots 

3D superformula: a = b = 1; m, n1, n2 and n3 are shown in the pictures.

A GNU Octave program for generating these figures:
function sf3d(n, a)
  u = [- pi:.05:pi];
  v = [- pi / 2:.05:pi / 2];
  nu = length(u);
  nv = length(v);
  for i = 1:nu
    for j = 1:nv
      raux1 = abs(1 / a(1) * abs(cos(n(1) .* u(i) / 4))) .^ n(3) + abs(1 / a(2) * abs(sin(n(1) * u(i) / 4))) .^ n(4);
      r1 = abs(raux1) .^ (- 1 / n(2));
      raux2 = abs(1 / a(1) * abs(cos(n(1) * v(j) / 4))) .^ n(3) + abs(1 / a(2) * abs(sin(n(1) * v(j) / 4))) .^ n(4);
      r2 = abs(raux2) .^ (- 1 / n(2));
      x(i, j) = r1 * cos(u(i)) * r2 * cos(v(j));
      y(i, j) = r1 * sin(u(i)) * r2 * cos(v(j));
      z(i, j) = r2 * sin(v(j));
    endfor;
  endfor;
  mesh(x, y, z);
endfunction;

Generalization 
The superformula can be generalized by allowing distinct m parameters in the two terms of the superformula. By replacing the first parameter  with y and second parameter  with z:

This allows the creation of rotationally asymmetric and nested structures.

References

External links 

 Some Experiments on Fitting of Gielis Curves by Simulated Annealing and Particle Swarm Methods of Global Optimization
 Least Squares Fitting of Chacón-Gielis Curves By the Particle Swarm Method of Optimization
 Superformula 2D Plotter & SVG Generator
 Interactive example using JSXGraph
 SuperShaper: An OpenSource, OpenCL accelerated, interactive 3D SuperShape generator with shader based visualisation (OpenGL3)
 Simpel, WebGL based SuperShape implementation

Geometric shapes
Curves
Surfaces